Vice-Admiral Peter William Cairns  (October 4, 1938 – February 18, 2023) was an officer of the Canadian Armed Forces. He was Commander Maritime Command from 14 July 1992 to 28 July 1994.

Career
Cairns joined the Royal Canadian Navy in 1956 and was appointed a midshipman in 1959. He became Commanding Officer of the submarine  in 1972, Commander of the First Canadian Submarine Squadron in 1974 and Commanding Officer of the destroyer  in 1976. He became Deputy Commandant of the Canadian Forces Fleet School at Halifax in 1978. After that he was appointed Chief Project Technical Officer at Canadian Forces Maritime Command in 1979, Commandant of the Canadian Forces Maritime Warfare School later that year and Commander Fifth Canadian Destroyer Squadron in 1981. Next he became Chief of Personnel Careers (Officers and Senior Appointments) at the National Defence Headquarters in 1983, Director-General Personnel Careers (Officers) in 1985 and Deputy Chief of Staff (Operations) to the Supreme Allied Commander Atlantic in 1987. His last appointments were as Commander Maritime Forces Pacific in 1989 and as Commander Maritime Command in 1992 before he retired in 1994.

In retirement Cairns became Director of Business Development at the Aviation Services Division of Spar Aerospace. He died on February 18, 2023 in Ottawa, Ontario.

Awards and decorations
Cairns's personal awards and decorations include:

100px

He was a qualified Submariner and as such wore the Canadian Forces Submariner Dolphins

References

1938 births
Canadian admirals
Living people
People from Orillia
Commanders of the Order of Military Merit (Canada)
Royal Canadian Navy officers
Commanders of the Royal Canadian Navy
Canadian military personnel from Ontario